Refraction networking, also known as decoy routing, is a research anti-censorship approach that would allow users to circumvent a censor without using any individual proxy servers. Instead, it implements proxy functionality at the core of partner networks, such as those of Internet service providers, outside the censored country. These networks would discreetly provide censorship circumvention for "any connection that passes through their networks." This prevents censors from selectively blocking proxy servers and makes censorship more expensive, in a strategy similar to collateral freedom.

The approach was independently invented by teams at the University of Michigan, the University of Illinois, and Raytheon BBN Technologies. There are five existing protocols: Telex, TapDance, Cirripede, Curveball, and Rebound. These teams are now working together to develop and deploy refraction networking with support from the U.S. Department of State.

See also 

 Domain fronting

References

External links 

 Official website

Internet privacy software
Anonymity networks
Computer security
Secure communication
Internet censorship